EasyJet is a British low-cost airline group

Easy Jet may also refer to:

Easy Jet (horse) (1967–1992) an American Quarter Horse who won the 1969 All American Futurity.
EasyJet UK, a British low-cost airline
EasyJet Switzerland (aka 'EasyJet'), a Swiss low-cost airline
EasyJet Europe (aka 'EasyJet'), an Austrian low-cost airline

See also
 EZjet (EZJ), defunct airline of Guyana